Epichorista hemionana is a species of moth of the family Tortricidae. It is found in New Zealand.

References

Moths described in 1883
Epichorista